Walter Lewis may refer to:

Walter Lewis (judge) (1849–1930), advocate and chief justice of British Honduras
Wally Lewis (born 1959), Australian rugby league footballer
Walter Lewis (rower) (1885–1956), Canadian Olympic rower
Walter Lewis (trade unionist) (died 1926), Welsh trade union leader
Walter P. Lewis (1866–1932), American silent film actor
Walter Lewis (blues) (1893 or 1899–1981), American musician
Walter Lewis (gridiron football) (born 1962), gridiron football player